喀什 is the Chinese transcription for Kashgar, a city in extreme western Xinjiang, and thus could refer to：
 Kashgar Prefecture, the wider region. 
 Kashgar City